Peter Lambert may refer to:

 Peter Lambert (baseball) (born 1997), American baseball pitcher
 Peter Lambert (brigadier) (contemporary), Australian army officer and defence scientist
 Peter Lambert (Gaelic footballer) (fl. 1991–2003), retired Irish sportsperson
 Peter Lambert (rosarian) (1859–1939), German rosarian
 Peter Lambert (rower) (born 1986), British rower

See also 
 Richard Peter Lambert (born 1944), British journalist and business executive